La Taxista is a Mexican telenovela produced by Imagen Televisión, and stars Ana Belena, Marcus Ornellas, and Cecilia Galliano. It is an adaptation of the Chilean telenovela titled Eres mi tesoro created by Yusef Rumie. It premiered on 17 September 2018 and ended on 10 January 2019.

Plot 
Victoria (Ana Belena), a woman who, with enthusiasm and joy, attempts to move forward her mother Lupita (Martha Mariana Castro) and her sister, Marion (Vanessa Silva) driving the taxi of her late father. Victoria's main concern is her daughter Daniela (Camila Rivas), a small girl with different abilities that fills with joy their humble home. Everyone expects Victoria to marry Juan (Mike Biaggio), the man they believe is perfect for her and who also adores Daniela. Juan asks Victoria and little Daniela for marriage, and the girl accepts without hesitation. Victoria, who loves him with all her heart, but as a friend, accepts the proposal because of the well-intentioned pressure of her family and because she believes that she will not find a better father for her daughter. Victoria falls in love with Alvaro when she almost run him over with her taxi. Alvaro (Marcus Ornellas), is a successful automotive entrepreneur, who is emotionally destroyed after learning that Carolina (Cecilia Galliano), his wife, has been unfaithful. Álvaro, about to suffer a heart attack, asks Victoria for help, who gets him into the taxi and using her driving skills, manages to take him to the hospital saving his life. This experience unites Victoria and Álvaro in a relationship. The taxi driver and the businessman will fight for their love, showing that there are always second chances.

Cast 
 Ana Belena as Victoria Martínez Contreras
 Marcus Ornellas as Álvaro Lizárraga Larios
 Mike Biaggio as Juan
 Julio Camejo as Rodrigo Moreal Castillo
 Cecilia Galliano as Carolina Ruíz Lizárraga
 Martha Mariana Castro as Lupita Contreras
 Carmen Beato as Emilia Larios Viuda de Lizárraga
 Julieta Grajales as Susana
 Perla Encinas as Clara Lizárraga Larios
 Vanessa Silva as Marion Martínez Contreras
 Eduardo Shacklet as Abundio "El Tigre" Pizarro
 Abel Fernando as Pancho
 Daniel Barona as Patricio Lizárraga Ruíz
 Marco León as Ricardo "Richie" Pizarro
 Tamara Guzmán as Lolia
 Camila Rivas as Daniela Martínez
 Óscar Casanova as Cerillo

Ratings 
 
}}

Notes

Episodes

References

External links 
 

2018 Mexican television series debuts
2019 Mexican television series endings
2018 telenovelas
Mexican telenovelas
Imagen Televisión telenovelas
Mexican television series based on Chilean television series